Josef Feistauer (6 August 1893 – 1972) was a Czech cross-country skier. He competed in the men's 50 kilometre event at the 1928 Winter Olympics.

References

External links
 

1893 births
1972 deaths
Czech male cross-country skiers
Olympic cross-country skiers of Czechoslovakia
Cross-country skiers at the 1928 Winter Olympics
People from Semily District
Sportspeople from the Liberec Region